Siridapha is a genus of flies in the family Pyrgotidae.

Species 
S. filipalpis Enderlein, 1942
S. mulunguensis Vanschuytbroeck, 1963
S. ophionea Enderlein, 1942

References 

Pyrgotidae
Diptera of Africa
Brachycera genera
Taxa named by Günther Enderlein